Eliran Atar (born 17 February 1987) is an Israeli professional footballer who plays for Bnei Yehuda as a forward.

Early life
Atar was born in Tel Aviv, Israel, to a Moroccan Jewish family.

Club career

Bnei Yehuda
On 7 February 2009, when playing for Bnei Yehuda, Atar scored from an overhead kick that was a candidate for the 2009 Puskás Award, though finishing fourth (i.e., the fourth most beautiful goal of that year). He became the top scorer of the 2008–09 Israeli Premier League season with 14 goals.

Maccabi Tel Aviv

On 7 May 2010, Atar signed a four-years contract with Maccabi Tel Aviv for a transfer fee of $1.2 million.

On 26 August 2010 he was selected to the Player Of The Match with two amazing goals on the win 4–3 over PSG in the Europa League. Atar completed his first season with Maccabi as the club's top goalscorer with 18 league goals and 22 overall (all competitions) season goals. He attracts interest from VfL Wolfsburg, 1. FC Nürnberg, Parma and Betis.

Reims
On 24 June Atar, signed a four-year deal with Ligue 1 side Stade de Reims.

Maccabi Haifa
On 15 January 2015, he signed a three half-year deal with Israeli Premier League side Maccabi Haifa.

International career
On 28 August 2010 Atar received his first call-up for the Israeli National Team squad for UEFA Euro 2012 qualifiers against Malta and Georgia but withdrew himself from the squad due to an eye injury received in a league match against Beitar Jerusalem. In October 2012, Atar was called up again to the Israeli squad before a double header 2014 FIFA World Cup qualifier against Luxembourg but yet again was released from the squad due to a lower back injury without making a national appearance. Atar, however, was able to make his debut in an international friendly defeat against Belarus, on 14 November 2012. On 12 November 2016, almost exactly four years later, Atar scored his first ever international goal for Israel in a 2018 FIFA World Cup Qualification match against Albania. It was only his fourth cap since 2012 and Israel won, 3–0.

Career statistics

Club

International

Scores and results list Israel's goal tally first, score column indicates score after each Atar goal.

Honours

Club
Maccabi Tel Aviv
Israeli Premier League: 2012–13, 2018–19
Toto Cup : 2017–18, 2018–19  

Maccabi Haifa
Israel State Cup: 2015–16

Individual
FIFA Puskas Award 4th place: 2009
Israeli Premier League – 2008–09 Top Goalscorer 1st place (Joint)

Israeli Premier League – 2010–11 Top Goalscorer 2nd place
Israeli Premier League – 2012–13 Top Goalscorer 1st place
Footballer of the Year in Israel: 2012–13

References

External links
 

1987 births
Living people
Israeli Mizrahi Jews
Israeli footballers
Israel youth international footballers
Israel international footballers
Bnei Yehuda Tel Aviv F.C. players
Maccabi Tel Aviv F.C. players
Stade de Reims players
Maccabi Haifa F.C. players
Beitar Jerusalem F.C. players
Israeli Premier League players
Ligue 1 players
Israeli expatriate footballers
Expatriate footballers in France
Israeli expatriate sportspeople in France
Footballers from Tel Aviv
Israeli people of Iraqi-Jewish descent
Israeli people of Moroccan-Jewish descent
Association football forwards
Israeli Footballer of the Year recipients